This is a list of Indonesians ordered by their net worth. According to Forbes (2007), there were only two Indonesians who were listed among world's billionaires.  Robert Budi Hartono (and family) was ranked in the 664th with total net worth of US$1.5 billion. They made profit from kretek (clove cigarettes) company Djarum and their shares in Bank Central Asia, respectively.

2022 Indonesia's 50 Richest People 
Below is a list of Indonesia's 50 richest people and their net worth

Source: Forbes Magazine (2022)

Indonesia's Richest State Officials 

Below is the list of Indonesia's richest state officials and their net worth.

References 

 
Indonesian
Economy of Indonesia-related lists